Dueñas or Duenas may refer to:

People
Christopher Duenas, Guamanian Olympic swimmer
Crispin Duenas (born 1986), Canadian Olympic archer
Henry Duenas, Jr. (born 1965), Filipino politician
Jani Dueñas (born 1975), Chilean actress and comedian
Jesus Baza Duenas (1911–1944), Guamanian Catholic priest and leader
María Dueñas (born 1964), Spanish writer
María Dueñas (violinist) (born 2002), Spanish Violinist
Marcos Francisco Duenas, Spanish Paralympic athlete
Ping Duenas (1930–2009), Guamanian politician

Places
Dueñas, Iloilo, Philippines
Dueñas, Palencia, Spain